The Yugoslavia men's national under-18 ice hockey team was the men's national under-18 ice hockey team in the Socialist Federal Republic of Yugoslavia. It was succeeded by the Serbia and Montenegro men's national under-18 ice hockey team.

International competitions

IIHF European U18/U19 Championships
 

1969: 3rd in Group B
1970: 6th in Group B
1971: did not participate
1972: 3rd in Group B
1973: 3rd in Group B
1974: 6th in Group B
1975: 3rd in Group B
1976: 2nd in Group B
1977: 2nd in Group B
1978: 4th in Group B
1979: 3rd in Group B
1980: 2nd in Group B

1981: 3rd in Group B
1982: 8th in Group B
1983: 1st in Group C
1984: 7th in Group B
1985: 7th in Group B
1986: 6th in Group B
1987: 5th in Group B
1988: 3rd in Group B
1989: 7th in Group B
1990: 4th in Group B
1991: 2nd in Group B
1992: 8th in Group B

References

National under-18 ice hockey teams
Former national ice hockey teams